Tunte Cantero (born 9 August 1975) is a Spanish sailor. He competed in the men's 470 event at the 2000 Summer Olympics.

References

External links
 

1975 births
Living people
Spanish male sailors (sport)
Olympic sailors of Spain
Sailors at the 2000 Summer Olympics – 470
Place of birth missing (living people)